Bernardo Barral Martins Santos  (born 29 December 1989), better known simply as Bê Martins, is a Brazilian-born, Portuguese beach soccer player who plays as a midfielder. He is a two-time winner of the FIFA Beach Soccer World Cup (2015 and 2019); he claimed the Bronze Ball (third best player) award at the latter.

He has an identical twin brother, Leonardo, who is also a high-profile beach soccer player.

Biography
Bê and his twin brother, Léo Martins, were born in Brazil. Bê was born two minutes before his younger sibling. Aged 18, went to play association football in Spain. During this time, they began the application process for Portuguese citizenship. This was possible since their paternal great-grandfather was from the country. In 2009, citizenship was achieved. In 2011, their contracts ended and aged 21, they returned to Brazil to find a new club. To maintain their fitness, they began training on the beach. Struggling to find a new football club, they started to pursue beach soccer instead, joining Vasco da Gama and soon after, Flamengo. Bê progressed somewhat quicker than his brother; after impressing for Flamengo at the 2012 Mundialito de Clubes, he was offered a role at a Russian club to which he moved. He was later followed by his twin.

Bê was called up to the Brazilian national team in 2012 for an exhibition tournament in Paraguay. However, soon after, Júnior Negão became the new head coach of Brazil, and Bê found himself out of favour.

The twins received an offer to join the Portugal squad at the end of 2014 after playing for clubs in Italy. Despite renewed offers from the Brazilian national team for Bê, the brothers decided they wanted to represent Portugal instead, citing their belief that there would be less chance of a "follow-up" if they were to join Brazil, their admiration for the country, and for Portuguese legends Madjer and Alan. Bê debuted for Portugal at the 2014 Beach Soccer Intercontinental Cup, six months before his brother, earning 15 caps during that time.

The following year, aged 24, Bê was awarded with the "Rising Star" commendation at the 2015 Beach Soccer Stars awards ceremony, as chosen by the Beach Soccer Worldwide expert committee. That year, both brothers moved to Braga with whom they would go on to win multiple domestic and European titles.

Bê was particularly influential during Portugal's 2019 World Cup win, being honoured as the third best player of the competition, winning the Bronze Ball award. Following the World Cup victory, along with the rest of the squad, Bê was made a Commander of the Order of Merit.

Statistics

County

Club

Honours
The following is a selection, not an exhaustive list, of the major international honours that Bê has achieved:

Country
FIFA Beach Soccer World Cup
Winner (2): 2015, 2019
Euro Beach Soccer League
Winner (3): 2015, 2019, 2020
European Games
Gold medal (1): 2019
Bronze medal (1): 2015
Euro Beach Soccer Cup
Winner (1): 2016
Mundialito
Winner (3): 2016, 2017, 2018
Intercontinental Cup
Runner-up (1): 2019

Club
Euro Winners Cup
Winner (3): 2017, 2018, 2019
Runner-up (3): 2015, 2020, 2021
Mundialito de Clubes
Winner (3): 2017, 2019, 2020
Runner-up (1): 2012

Individual
FIFA Beach Soccer World Cup (1):
Bronze Ball: 2019
Beach Soccer Stars (1):
Rising Star: 2015
Euro Beach Soccer League (2):
Superfinal:
Best player: 2016
Regular season stages:
Best player: 2018(1)
Mundialito de Clubes (1):
Best player: 2019

References

External links

Bernardo Barral Martins Santos, profile at Beach Soccer Worldwide
Bê Martins at playmakerstats.com (English version of zerozero.pt)
Bernardo Barral Martins, profile at Beach Soccer Russia (in Russian)

1989 births
Living people
Portuguese beach soccer players
European Games gold medalists for Portugal
European Games bronze medalists for Portugal
European Games medalists in beach soccer
Beach soccer players at the 2019 European Games
Beach soccer players at the 2015 European Games
Brazilian emigrants to Portugal
Commanders of the Order of Merit (Portugal)
Portuguese twins
Twin sportspeople